In enzymology, a [acyl-carrier-protein] S-acetyltransferase is an enzyme that catalyzes the reversible chemical reaction

acetyl-CoA + [acyl-carrier-protein]  CoA + acetyl-[acyl-carrier-protein]

Thus, the two substrates of this enzyme are acetyl-CoA and acyl carrier protein, whereas its two products are CoA and acetyl-acyl-carrier-protein.

This enzyme belongs to the family of transferases, specifically those acyltransferases transferring groups other than aminoacyl groups.  The systematic name of this enzyme class is acetyl-CoA:[acyl-carrier-protein] S-acetyltransferase. Other names in common use include acetyl coenzyme A-acyl-carrier-protein transacylase, Acetyl CoA:ACP transacylase, [acyl-carrier-protein]acetyltransferase, [ACP]acetyltransferase, and ACAT.  This enzyme participates in fatty acid biosynthesis.

Structural studies

As of late 2007, only one structure has been solved for this class of enzymes, with the PDB accession code .

References

 
 
 
 
 
 

EC 2.3.1
Enzymes of known structure